Lituya Glacier is a tidewater glacier in the U.S. state of Alaska. Located at  inside Glacier Bay National Park and Preserve, its source is in the Fairweather Range and it feeds into Lituya Bay on the gulf coast of Southeast Alaska.

It is partially responsible for creating the 1958 Lituya Bay megatsunami. The glacier, which has receded over the years, carved Lituya Bay into a unique topographic phenomenon with steep walls, a very deep submerged bottom, and a very narrow entrance to the ocean which created the opportunity for a megatsunami to occur.

The glacier is also the namesake of the Alaska Marine Highway ferry M/V Lituya.

See also
 List of glaciers

External links

 World's Biggest Tsunami: The largest recorded tsunami with a wave 1720 feet tall in Lituya Bay, Alaska

Glaciers of Glacier Bay National Park and Preserve
Glaciers of Hoonah–Angoon Census Area, Alaska
Glaciers of Unorganized Borough, Alaska